My Little Wife is a 1984 Soviet drama film directed by Raimundas Banionis.

Plot
Student Linas meets with Ruta, who is the daughter of the vice-rector of the institute. Further events develop in such a way that the hero who started classes is forced to go to the apartment to the professor and ask the girl for help, so Ruta's deception reveals itself. Finding her real parents, drunk and down people, Linas decides to marry the girl. He is transferred to the evening department to be able to work and help his wife study to be a zoologist.

Cast 
 Saulius Balandis as Linas Tamonis
 Ingeborga Dapkūnaitė as Aukse
 Eleonora Korisnaite as Ruta
  as Vytas
  as Tomas
 Vytautas Paukštė as Pranas Norvilas
  as Stasialis
  as Ramanauskiene

References

External links 

1984 drama films
1984 films
Soviet drama films